Proserpinaca palustris, the marsh mermaidweed or common mermaid-weed, is a species of flowering plant in the watermilfoil family (Haloragaceae). It is found in North America, the Caribbean, and Central America.

Description
They are deeply divided into linear segments and the emergent leaves are simply serrated. It has fruits with concave sides and sharp or winged angles.

Taxonomy
There are two known varieties;
P. palustris var. palustris - which has fruits 4-6mm wide, angles wing margined, very rare SE and NW
P. palustris var. crebra (Fernald and Griscom) - which has fruits 2-4mm wide, angles not winged, occasional E and NW

Habitat
It grows in swamps, bogs, ponds and marshes.

Gallery

References

Haloragaceae
Plants described in 1753
Taxa named by Carl Linnaeus